Soft Power is a musical (also referred to by its authors as a "play with a musical") with book and lyrics by David Henry Hwang and music and additional lyrics by Jeanine Tesori.

Soft Power was intended as a "reverse The King And I". Instead of exoticizing an Asian country, Soft Power exoticizes America by looking at it from a hypothetical future Chinese musical. It also serves as a quasi-sequel to Hwang's 2007 play Yellow Face, featuring the same DHH character who appeared in said play.

Performances
It began performances at the Ahmanson Theatre in Los Angeles in May 2018 and at San Francisco's Curran Theatre in June. The musical began performances off-Broadway at The Public Theater on September 14, 2019, directed by Leigh Silverman, and closed on November 17, 2019. The show was nominated for 11 awards at the 2020 Drama Desk Awards, the most of any show that year, but didn't win any.

Summary
Partly based on Hwang's real life (particularly an actual event from 2015 where he was stabbed in the neck), the play with a musical features a fever dream with a Chinese businessman, Xue Xing, who travels to America for work. There, he meets and becomes close to Hillary Clinton. Many of the details about America are "as hilariously inexact as most Western stories set in Asia". For example, Xing travels to the "Hollywood Airport" and Hillary performs a number while revealing a Wonder Woman outfit in a glitzy McDonald's. It also examines the nature of democracy, cultural identity, appropriation and racism. In particular, most of the "white" roles are played by Asian actors in whiteface and incorrect accents, a reversal of the movie version of The King and I.

Cast and Characters

Musical numbers

Act 1
Overture
Dutiful — Xuē Xíng, Jīng
Welcome to America — Airport Greeter, Ensemble
Fuxing Park — Xuē Xíng, DHH
I'm With Her — Hillary, Betsy, Xuē Xíng, DHH, Ensemble
It Just Takes Time — Xuē Xíng, Hillary
Election Night — Chief Justice, DHH, Bobby Bob, Ensemble
I Am — DHH, Xuē Xíng

Act 2
Entr'acte / Song of the Campaign — Hillary
Happy Enough — Xuē Xíng, Hillary
Good Guy with a Gun — Randy Ray, Ensemble
The New Silk Road — Xuē Xíng, Ensemble
Democracy — Hillary, Xuē Xíng
Democracy (Reprise) — Company

Critical response 
Sam Hurwitt of The Mercury News called it "marvelously clever", also saying that Alyse Alan Louis as Hillary Clinton "tears the roof off the place", and Frank Rizzo of Variety said it was "subversive as well as funny, touching and thoroughly entertaining". In more mixed reviews, Jackson McHenry of Vulture said that it tended to be fascinating and messy, with the musical within the play being "occasionally too clever by half", and Jesse Green of The New York Times said that it was "something of a miracle but also something of a muddle", and "it's the kind of show that deserves, and unfortunately needs, to be seen at least twice."

Awards and nominations 
Soft Power won six of Los Angeles' 2019 Ovation Awards, including Best Production of a Musical (Large Theater).

The Public Theater production of Soft Power was nominated for five Lucille Lortel Awards, including Outstanding Musical.

The musical was named 2020 Pulitzer Prize for Drama finalist, with the committee cited the show as "A multi-layered and mischievous musical that deconstructs a beloved, original American art form to examine the promise and the limits of representation in both the theatrical and political senses of the word."

Original Off-Broadway production

Recording
The original cast recording was released on April 17, 2020 through Ghostlight Records. The album peaked at number 11 on the Billboard Cast Albums chart.

References

Musicals by Jeanine Tesori
Off-Broadway musicals
2018 musicals
Plays set in the 21st century
Plays about race and ethnicity
Plays set in China
Plays by David Henry Hwang
Metafictional plays
Hillary Clinton 2016 presidential campaign